Robuck or Roebuck O'Shaughnessey (died 1762?) was an Irish Chief of the Name and Lord of  Cenél Áeda na hEchtge.

Robuck was a younger brother of the previous chief. He continued his brothers legal proceedings against Sir Thomas Prendergast, 2nd Baronet, and his nephew and heir, John Prendergast Smyth, 1st Viscount Gort. The case was ongoing at the time of his death.

Robuck had issue Joseph (died 1783), William, Mary, Catherine, Ellice, Elleanor, all alive in 1784.

References

 D'Alton, John, Illustrations, Historical and Genealogical, of King James's Irish Army List (1689). Dublin: 1st edition (single volume), 1855. pp. 328–332.
 History of Galway, James Hardiman, 1820
 Tabular pedigrees of O'Shaughnessy of Gort (1543–1783), Martin J. Blake, Journal of the Galway Archaeological and Historical Society, vi (1909–1910), p. 64; vii (1911–1912), p. 53.
 John O'Donovan. The Genealogies, Tribes, and Customs of Hy-Fiachrach. Dublin: Irish Archaeological Society. 1844. Pedigree of O'Shaughnessy: pp. 372–391.
 Old Galway, Professor Mary Donovan O'Sullivan, 1942
 Galway: Town and Gown, edited Moran et al., 1984
 Galway: History and Society, 1996

People from County Galway
18th-century Irish people
Roebuck
1762 deaths
Year of birth unknown